Atanasie Protopopesco (8 April 1900 – 22 February 1991) was a Romanian football defender.

Protopopesco played one game at international level for Romania in a 1923 friendly which ended 2–2 against Turkey. He was also part of Romania's 1924 Summer Olympics squad.

References

External links
 

1900 births
1991 deaths
Romanian footballers
Romania international footballers
Footballers at the 1924 Summer Olympics
Unirea Tricolor București players
Association football defenders
Footballers from Bucharest